is a beat 'em up arcade game released by SNK in 1991 for the Neo Geo MVS system. Introduced to capture a share in the then-popular beat 'em ups market, it was meant to compete with Technōs' Double Dragon, the leader of the genre at the time. Three years after its release in the arcades and on the Neo Geo AES, it was released on Neo Geo CD as the only other home version.

The game is produced by Eikichi Kawasaki, one of SNK's founders and the man behind various well-known SNK titles, such as Fatal Fury, Art of Fighting and Samurai Shodown series.

A re-released version of Burning Fight is included in SNK Arcade Classics Vol. 1, which was released for the PlayStation 2, PlayStation Portable and Wii in 2008.

Story 
Duke and Billy, two popular and renowned New York City Police detectives, are hot on the trail of a dangerous Japanese crime syndicate. Their investigation has led them to the mean streets of Japan where they meet a police officer and martial arts expert named Ryu. Ryu agrees to join the NYPD detectives as they track down the crime syndicate bosses and end their reign of terror once and for all.

Gameplay 

Burning Fight follows a formula and concepts commonly seen in titles of this genre, such as Streets of Rage, Double Dragon and Final Fight: balanced character selection, objects and weapons found on the ground cause greater damage to opponents, and semi-interactive environments (players can damage objects like phone booths and street signs along the way). The game is set in a fictional version of Osaka city (during a train station scene the platform even shows an "Umida" station sign).

The five levels must be completed (Casterora is the last enemy) to win the game.

Reception 

In Japan, Game Machine listed Burning Fight on their June 15, 1991 issue as being the eighth most-popular arcade game at the time. Likewise, RePlay reported the game to be the second most-popular arcade game at the time. The title received generally mixed reception from critics since its release in arcades and other platforms, with most reviewers comparing it with better known competitors in the beat 'em up genre. Both the Neo Geo and Nintendo Switch versions hold a 55% and 30% respectively on the review aggregator GameRankings.

AllGames Kyle Knight regarded Burning Fight as a Final Fight rip-off of inferior quality. Knight criticized the "jerky and stiff" character animations, lack of enemy variety, as well as the repetitive fighting system and gameplay but commended the controls and audio. In contrast, Consoles Plus Loulou and El Nio Nio compared the game with both Final Fight and Streets of Rage but praised the presentation, graphics, animations, hard rock-style soundtrack, gameplay and longevity. Computer and Video Games Paul Rand and Tim Boone also regarded the title as a Final Fight rip-off, while Rand in particular drew comparison between Cody and Guy with two of the playable characters. Unlike Knight, both Rand and Boone praised the visuals, sound, gameplay and longevity but criticized the absence of unlimited continues in the AES version.

GamePros Slasher Quan remarked that it was similar to Final Fight in terms of visuals and gameplay but also praised the presentation and music. Both Joypads Steph and Joysticks Jean-Marc Demoly compared Burning Fight with Final Fight, Ninja Gaiden and Streets of Rage but praised the audiovisual presentation and controls. Player Ones Cyril Drevet compared its two-player mode with Double Dragon but commended the visuals, animations, audio, difficulty and longevity. However, Sinclair User highlighted a sense of dullness in the game, stating that "Burning Fight is a competent journey along the usual beat-'em-up road..."

Burning Fight has been met with a much more mixed reception from critics in recent years, with Eurogamers Dan Whitehead in particular regarding the game as a blatant copy of both Final Fight and Streets of Rage. IGNs Lucas M. Thomas also compared its gameplay to Double Dragon but regarded it as more playable than Ninja Combat. Nintendo Lifes Damien McFerran and Dave Frear were critical of the title when reviewing the Virtual Console and Nintendo Switch releases respectively, comparing the playable cast of characters with those of Final Fight, while McFerran criticized the poor character animations.

Notes

References

External links 
 Burning Fight at GameFAQs
 Burning Fight at Giant Bomb
 Burning Fight at Killer List of Videogames
 Burning Fight at MobyGames

1991 video games
ACA Neo Geo games
Arcade video games
SNK beat 'em ups
Cooperative video games
D4 Enterprise games
Multiplayer and single-player video games
Neo Geo games
Neo Geo CD games
Nintendo Switch games
PlayStation Network games
PlayStation 4 games
Side-scrolling beat 'em ups
SNK Playmore games
Video games about police officers
Virtual Console games
Windows games
Xbox One games
Video games developed in Japan
Hamster Corporation games